Broadway Avenue Historic District may refer to:

Broadway Avenue Historic District (Detroit)
Broadway Avenue Historic District (Cleveland, Ohio)
Broadway-Livingston Avenue Historic District, Albany, New York

See also
Broadway Historic District (disambiguation)
Broadway Historic Theater District